The 1973 Argentine Grand Prix was a Formula One motor race held at the Buenos Aires circuit on 28 January 1973. It was race 1 of 15 in both the 1973 World Championship of Drivers and the 1973 International Cup for Formula One Manufacturers. The 96-lap race was won by Lotus driver Emerson Fittipaldi after he started from second position. François Cevert finished second for the Tyrrell team and his teammate Jackie Stewart came in third.

Classification

Qualifying

Race

Championship standings after the race

Drivers' Championship standings

Constructors' Championship standings

Note: Only the top five positions are included for both sets of standings.

References

Argentine Grand Prix
Argentine Grand Prix
Grand Prix
Argentine Grand Prix